SPF-18 is a 2017 USA coming-of-age romantic comedy film directed by Alex Israel in his directorial debut. Israel co-wrote the screenplay with Michael Berk. The film stars Carson Meyer, Noah Centineo, Bianca A. Santos, Jackson White, Molly Ringwald and Rosanna Arquette, and is narrated by Goldie Hawn.

Summary 

Seventeen year old Penny Cooper is obsessed with filmography, since as a child it was the only way to get close to her mother, a Hollywood actress. She just graduated high school and is looking forward to the next four years at Northwestern.

Johnny is still coping with the loss of his dad, when he is asked to house sit for a friend. His friend tells him to "live it up" and invite friends to stay at the house, which is very luxurious and by the beach. Johnny then invites Penny, who is his girlfriend, and her free-spirited cousin, Camilla.

Knowing Penny has not lost her virginity to Johnny yet, she suggests a "prom do-over." Penny and Johnny have sex that night. After the do-over, Camilla spots a person swimming nude on the beach. Unbeknownst to her, the person is Ash Baker, a country singer who quit his agency after they tried to change his image.

The next morning, a local lifeguard named Steve attempts to cite Ash for camping on the beach. Penny, Camilla and Johnny intervene and invite Ash to the house. After exchanging pleasantries the group takes a group surfing lesson with Steve later that day. Camilla complains that the wetsuits are all plain and black. Later that night the group bond back at the house. Penny and Ash begin to bond in particular. Still upset about his father's death, Johnny rides off from the group to do some night surfing.

Cast
 Carson Meyer as Penny Cooper
 Noah Centineo as Johnny Sanders Jr.
 Bianca A. Santos as Camilla Barnes
 Jackson White as Ash Baker
 Sean Russel Herman as Steve Galmarini
 Rosanna Arquette as Linda Sanders
 Molly Ringwald as Faye Cooper
 Keanu Reeves as himself
 Pamela Anderson as herself
 Goldie Hawn as the narrator

Production
Principal photography took place in Malibu, California in May 2015. The film was released on iTunes on September 29, 2017, and was made available on Netflix in October 2017.

Reception
On Rotten Tomatoes, the film has 2 reviews; both are negative.

References

External links
 
 

2017 films
2010s coming-of-age comedy films
2017 romantic comedy films
American coming-of-age comedy films
American romantic comedy films
Films shot in Los Angeles
Coming-of-age romance films
2017 directorial debut films
2010s English-language films
2010s American films